Stephen Gilbert (15 January 1910 – 12 January 2007) was a painter and sculptor from Scotland.  He was one of the few British artists fully to embrace the avant-garde movement in Paris in the 1950s.

Early years
Gilbert was born in Wormit, in the north-east of Fife, Scotland, of English parents. His father was a commander in the Royal Navy; his grandfather, Sir Alfred Gilbert was the Art Nouveau sculptor of The Angel of Christian Charity in Piccadilly Circus.

Education
He studied architecture at the Slade School of Art in London from 1929 to 1932, where he befriended fellow student Roger Hilton.  Gilbert won the Slade Scholarship at the end of his first year, and the principal Sir Henry Tonks encouraged him to start painting from 1930.  He also met sculptor Jocelyn Chewett at the Slade, and they were married in 1935.

Career
He exhibited at the Royal Academy in 1936, and put on an early solo show in London, at the Wertheim Gallery in 1938.  He moved to Paris in 1937, where his wife studied under Ossip Zadkine, leaving before the Second World War.  He failed a medical for military service, and he spent the war in Ireland near Dublin with his wife and son, Humphrey.  He joined The White Stag group of refugee artists.  His work was inspired by Masson, and by reading Jung, Nietzsche and Jakob Böhme, with fantastic creatures and plants painted in vivid colours.

He returned to Paris in 1946, after the birth of his daughter Frances. He exhibited at the Salon des Surindépendents in Paris in 1948, attracting the attention of Danish artist Asger Jorn, and leading to his membership of the CoBrA avant-garde art group. He was one of only two British members, the other being William Gear.  He was  included in the first issue of the group's journal and participated in both major exhibitions: the Bregnerød congress in August 1949, where he worked on the collective mural, and the Amsterdam exhibition at the Stedelijk Museum in November of that year, where he worked with Constant Nieuwenhuys. A French art critic described him as "le plus français des sculpteurs anglais et l'un des plus européens parmi les artistes" ("the most French of British sculptors and one of the most European of artists").

He also visited Max Walter Svanberg in Sweden. After his contact with CoBrA, his approach to painting became more abstract, but he remained in contact with Pierre Alechinsky after CoBrA dissolved.  He exhibited several times at the Salon des Réalités Nouvelles.

During the 1950s, he concentrated on three-dimensional and architectural forms, formed from sheets of aluminium.  He joined André Bloc's Groupe Espace in 1954, exhibiting at the Salon de la Jeune Sculpture.  He was also a founder of the Néovision group, and worked with experimental architect Peter Stead.  He moved on to more curvilinear forms, exhibited at the Drian Galleries in London in 1961, and completed two public commissions in London.  He received a Gulbenkian award in 1962, and the sculpture prize at the Tokyo Biennale in 1965.

His wife died in 1979, and his sculpture moved on from open forms to more enclosed structures. He returned to painting in the 1980s. Examples of his work are held by many public collections.

He died in Frome, Somerset and he was survived by his son and daughter.

References

Sources
Obituary, The Times, 19 January 2007 
 Obituary, The Independent, 24 January 2007
Obituary, The Guardian, 14 February 2007

External links
Works in the Tate Collection
2006 retrospective at Henry Moore Institute, Leeds 

1910 births
2007 deaths
20th-century Scottish painters
Scottish male painters
21st-century Scottish painters
21st-century Scottish male artists
Modern painters
People from Wormit
Alumni of the Slade School of Fine Art
Abstract painters
20th-century Scottish male artists